... All The Way, Boys! (aka  and Plane Crazy) is a  1973 Italian adventure film directed by Giuseppe Colizzi. The film stars the popular comedy team of Terence Hill and Bud Spencer. The duo  made  18 films together, most in the Spaghetti Western genre, but ... All The Way, Boys! was the first film set in a modern context, although many other slapstick elements of the earlier films were carried over.

Plot
Salud (Bud Spencer) and Plata (Terence Hill) eke out a living as bush pilots in South America. Beside carrying a few passengers and a small amount of cargo, their most lucrative activity is in faking aircraft crashes, on behalf of Salud's brother (Alexander Allerson), who will be able to collect the insurance money.

Flying over the Andes on another flight, the two pilots crash for real in the middle of the piranha-infested jungle. In a native village, they meet Matto (Cyril Cusack), an old man who takes Salud to see a mountain and tells him the story of three friends who killed each other. There, the duo find an emerald mining operation run by the unscrupulous Mr. Ears (Reinhard Kolldehoff). Ears dictates prices on the black market, uses thugs to keep out competitors, and keeps his workers as slave labor.

Plata and Salud decide they will confront Ears, using aircraft to deliver their goods, and offering the natives a much better life. Wanting to fly Matto to  Salvador, where he would live in a modern city, Plata and Salud take the old man and his dog along with them, but he passes away on the flight. Plata finds a large emerald tied to a cord that Matto wore.

In Salvador, the two inept crooks try to cash in on their find, but end up in jail. After a successful breakout, the pair find themselves pitted against the ruthless Ears, but in the end, right prevails.

Cast

 Terence Hill as Plata
 Bud Spencer as Salud
 Reinhard Kolldehoff as Mr. Ears 
 Riccardo Pizzuti as Naso
 Carlos Muñoz as Augusto
  as Puncher
 Sergio Bruzzichini as Pilot
 Cyril Cusack as Matto
 Alexander Allerson as Salud's brother
 Ferdinando Murolo as Man in jungle, searching for beer
 Michel Antoine as Daveira
 Antoine Saint-John as One of Mr. Ears gang (as Antoine St. John)

Production
... All the Way, Boys! was shot in Colombia, including scenes set at the Medellín airport. The aircraft that were utilized were: Beechcraft Model 18, Boeing 727, Boeing-Stearman PT-17, Cessna 182 Skylane, Cessna 310, Consolidated PBY-5A Catalina, de Havilland Canada DHC-2 Beaver, Douglas DC-3, Douglas DC-6, Douglas DC-8, Hawker Siddeley HS 748, Lockheed L-188 Electra, Lockheed T-33 and Piper PA-24 Comanche.

Reception
In trying to reach a more international audience, the original 120-minute Italian version (... Più forte ragazzi!) of ... All the Way, Boys! was re-edited into a 90-minute version and re-dubbed into English with dialogue and post-synchronization by Gene Luotto. The resultant release did not receive positive reviews, with film Historian Howard Hughes noting that ".. the resultant incoherence doesn't help the sluggish narrative."

Jim Craddock in Videohound's Golden Movie Retriever said, "The "Trinity cast up to no good ... crash-land a plane in the Andes, in the hope of finding slapstick, but found none."

Awards
... All the Way, Boys! won the Golden Screen award at the 1973 Golden Screen, Germany and the Silver Ribbon for Best Score (Migliore Musica) by Guido De Angelis and Maurizio De Angelis from the Italian National Syndicate of Film Journalists, 1973.

References

Notes

Citations

Bibliography

 Craddock, Jim, ed. Videohound's Golden Movie Retriever. Detroit: Visible Ink: 2001. .
 Hughes, Howard. Cinema Italiano: The Complete Guide from Classics to Cult. London: I.B. Tauris, 2011. .

External links

1972 films
Italian adventure comedy films
1970s Italian-language films
1970s adventure comedy films
Terence Hill and Bud Spencer
Films directed by Giuseppe Colizzi
Films scored by Guido & Maurizio De Angelis
Italian aviation films
Films set in Colombia
Films set in Brazil
Films about mining
Films shot in Colombia
1972 comedy films
1970s Italian films